Elidor is a children's fantasy novel by the British author Alan Garner, published by Collins in 1965. Set primarily in modern Manchester, it features four English children who enter a fantasy world, fulfill a quest there, and return to find that the enemy has followed them into our world. Translations have been published in nine languages and it has been adapted for television and radio.

Plot introduction
The story concerns the adventures of a group of children as they struggle to hold back a terrible darkness by fulfilling a prophecy from another world. The plot moves to and from the world of Elidor, and the city of Manchester and parts of northern Cheshire in the real world.

Like many of Garner's books, the emphasis of the narrative is on the hardships, cost and practicalities of the choices and responsibilities that the protagonists face.

Title

The name Elidor originates in a Welsh folktale whose title is commonly translated as Elidor and the Golden Ball, described by Giraldus Cambrensis in Itinerarium Cambriae, a record of his 1188 journey across the country. Elidor was a priest who as a boy was led by dwarves to a castle of gold in a land that, while beautiful, was not illuminated by the full light of the sun. This compares with Garner's description of the golden walls of Gorias contrasting with the dull sky of the land of Elidor.

Allusions and references

English folklore

Elidor begins with an epigraph quoting from William Shakespeare's King Lear: "Childe Rowland to the Dark Tower came" (Act III, sc. 4). This is also an allusion to the English folktale of "Childe Rowland", from which several elements of the plot of Elidor are drawn. Childe Rowland features the eponymous Rowland, his two brothers, and his sister Burd Ellen. Rowland kicks a ball over a church and when Burd Ellen attempts to retrieve it she disappears. Rowland's brothers then leave to find her but they do not return, leaving Rowland to rescue his siblings. Later Rowland must command a door to open in a hillside, wherein he finds Burd Ellen under a spell.

Irish mythology

The four castles of Elidor – Findias in the South, Falias in the West, Murias in the North, and Gorias in the East – correspond to the four cities of the Tuatha Dé Danann in Irish mythology – Finias (sic), Falias, Murias, and Gorias.

The four treasures of Elidor – the Spear of Ildana held by Malebron, David's sword, Nicholas's stone, and Helen's cauldron – correspond to the Four Treasures of the Tuatha Dé Danann – the Spear of Lugh, Claíomh Solais, Lia Fáil, and The Dagda's Cauldron. However, the associations between the treasures and the castles differ – in Elidor the Spear of Ildana is associated with Gorias, whereas the Irish mythological equivalent, the Spear of Lugh, is associated with Finias (although the treasure associated with Gorias, Claíomh Solais, is sometimes called the Sword of Lugh, which may explain the confusion).

Medieval fable

Late in the book a dying unicorn sings a 'swan song' and by this act brings a restitution of light to Elidor. According to the medieval legend, only the calming presence of a virgin can tame the wild and ferocious nature of the unicorn and only thus may it be killed.

Recognition 

Elidor was a commended runner-up for the annual Carnegie Medal from the Library Association, recognising the year's best children's book by a British subject.

Television adaptation

Garner and Don Webb adapted Elidor into a children's television series for the BBC. The series consisted of six half-hour episodes broadcast weekly from 4 January to 8 February 1995, starring Damian Zuk as Roland and Suzanne Shaw as Helen.

Publication history

Henry Z. Walck published the first US edition in 1967. German and Japanese-language translations were published in 1969 followed by Catalan, Swedish, Danish, Finnish, and Dutch in the next two decades; Persian and Chinese in 2005.

1965, UK, Collins (Pre-ISBN), Pub date 1965, Hardback
2002, UK, CollinsVoyager , Pub date 5 August 2002, Paperback

See also
 
 Celtic mythology

Notes

References

External links
  —immediately, first US edition 
 

1965 British novels
1965 children's books
1965 fantasy novels
Children's fantasy novels
British children's novels
British fantasy novels
Novels set in Manchester
Novels set in Cheshire
Novels by Alan Garner
Portal fantasy
William Collins, Sons books
1995 British television series debuts
1995 British television series endings
British television shows based on children's books
British children's fantasy television series
1990s British children's television series